Cindy Cash (born July 29, 1959) is an American singer, author, and antiques dealer.

Early years
Cash is the daughter of singer Johnny Cash and his first wife, Vivian Liberto. When she was a child, the family lived in Casitas Springs, California. The couple divorced when she was nine years old. Her siblings include singer Rosanne Cash.

Career 
Cash performed with her father and her stepmother, June Carter Cash. Her first duet with him as part of his show came when she was 16, and she also sang with him in his last performance. For two years, she sang in the group The Next Generation, which included Loretta Lynn's daughter Peggy, Conway Twitty's daughter Kathy, and George Jones' and Tammy Wynette's daughter Georgette. After she retired from entertaining, she operated an antique store in Ridgeland, Mississippi.

In 1997, Crown Publishing Group published her book, The Cash Family Scrapbook, which contains a variety of material about (and written by) her and members of her family. She began sorting material with a book in mind in 1985 and underwent starts and stops thereafter. The story began with her parents' marriage and continued up to the time of the book's publication.

Personal life 
When she was 18, Cash married her high school sweetheart. After they divorced, she and her daughter moved to Hendersonville, Tennessee, to be near her father. Her second husband was singer-songwriter Marty Stuart, whom she met when both were 21. They were married from 1983 to 1988. In 2003, she married Eddie Panetta, who died in a motorcycle accident in 2009.

References 

20th-century American women singers
American country musicians
American women country singers
American people of English descent
American people of Scottish descent
Cash–Carter family
1959 births
Living people
20th-century American singers
21st-century American women